Midnight on Dagger Alley is a solo adventure module for the first Advanced Dungeons & Dragons edition of the Dungeons & Dragons fantasy role-playing game, published in 1984 by TSR, Inc.

Plot summary

Midnight on Dagger Alley is a solo scenario for multiple characters, which uses a strip of transparent red film called the "magic viewer" to reveal hidden details of text and the map as needed by the player. The adventure is set in a dangerous thieves' quarter. The module includes a large map of the district which can only be read with the magic viewer. The action takes place in the "narrow mud alleys of the city of Goldstar".

Gameplay 
Midnight on Dagger Alley is a solitary adventure designed to be played with one of three sixth-level characters (monk, assassin, or thief) provided in the module. Each of these characters has a matching mission, and the action takes place in the waterfront area of a town depicted in four maps representing the four levels of the area; rooftops, second story, street level, and underground. The three given adventures involve rescuing a princess, searching for hidden treasure, and going on a scavenger hunt for the components of a complex spell, although the player character can have an adventure just wandering around.

Publication history
MV1 Midnight on Dagger Alley was published in 1984, and was written by Merle M. Rasmussen. The module features art by Jeff Easley. The module comes in a cardboard folder, with two double-sided maps, a tear-off cardboard sheet with character stats on one side and charts on the other and an eight-page booklet for the adventure. The adventure is intended for one player, with a playing time of one to three hours. The module also comes with a "magic viewer", a framed piece of red cellophane that is used to view areas of the map or read areas of text which are camouflaged by red mottling.

Reception
David J. Butler reviewed the adventure in The Space Gamer No. 73, referring to it instead as Midnight on Dagger Street. Butler felt the camouflage map had definite advantages over the chemical process TSR had previously used to hide text, because the map's features remain hidden no matter how many times the player uses the adventure; additionally he felt that the inability to see beyond the character's immediate area simulates wandering around a foggy waterfront. He felt that the four-level effect was "great fun for players who like to sneak and skulk, and adds a good feeling of depth to the adventure." Butler considered the adventures well thought out. The rescue operation seemed like the central feature of the module and provided a moderate challenge, while the treasure hunt was easiest, because the character is likely to stumble across the treasure even if he loses track of the clues. He thought the search for spell components was the most challenging (although tedious at points). Despite noting some minor faults, Butler felt the adventure gives players "several hours of fun and serves as a good module for inexperienced players."

Chris Hunter reviewed the module in Imagine magazine, giving it a negative review. He noted that the magic viewer works well, giving the impression of a limited field of vision on a moonless night. However, Hunter felt that the module "suffers all the usual problems of solos", in particular a lack of choice and a feeling of being channeled into actions. He thought that the module's main deficiency was that it was far too small. Hunter concluded the review by saying that this was "a novel idea but the size of the module makes it poor value for money".

References

Dungeons & Dragons modules
Role-playing game supplements introduced in 1984